The 789th Transport Helicopter Squadron (Serbo-Croatian:  / 789. транспортна хеликоптерска ескадрила) was a helicopter squadron of Yugoslav Air Force formed in October 1968 at Niš airport.

History
The 48th Helicopter Squadron was formed at Niš airport in May 1968 as part of 119th Transport Helicopter Regiment. It was equipped with Soviet-made Mil Mi-8T transport helicopters.

In 1990 due to the "Jedinstvo 3" reorganization plan, 789th Squadron was disbanded. Personnel and equipment were attached to 787th Transport Helicopter Squadron of same 119th Aviation Brigade.

Assignments
119th Transport Helicopter Regiment (Support, Aviation Brigade, 1968–1990)

Bases stationed
Niš (1968–1990)

Equipment
Mil Mi-8T (1968–1990)

References

Yugoslav Air Force squadrons
Military units and formations established in 1968